In mathematics, the Mahler polynomials gn(x) are polynomials introduced by  in his work on the zeros of the incomplete gamma function.

Mahler polynomials are given by the generating function

Mahler polynomials can be given as the Sheffer sequence for the functional inverse of 1+t–et .

The first few examples are

References

 Reprinted by Dover, 2005

Polynomials